Jingshi Tongyan (警世通言, Stories to Caution the World) is the second of a trilogy of widely celebrated Ming dynasty (1368–1644) vernacular story collections, compiled and edited by Feng Menglong and published in 1624. The first compilation, called Gujin Xiaoshuo (古今小説) (Stories Old and New), which is sometimes also referred to as Yushi Mingyan (喻世明言) (Stories to Enlighten the World or Illustrious Words to Instruct the World) was published in Suzhou in 1620. The third publication was called Xingshi hengyan (醒世恒言) (Stories to Awaken the World), and was published in 1627.

These three collections, often referred to as Sanyan (三言, "Three Words") because of the character yan (言) found at the end of each title, each contain 40 stories.

Genre
Jingshi Tongyan is considered to be a huaben (话本), that is, short novel or novella. The huaben genre has been around since the Song dynasty (960-1279). The huaben genre includes collections of short stories, like Jingshi Tongyan, historical stories, and even stories from Confucian classics.

Format
The format of Jingshi Tongyan follows the rest of the Sanyan, in that it contains 40 chapters, with each chapter being a different short story. Ling Mengchu, under the direct influence of Sanyan, wrote 2 more collections under the same format, known as Erpai (二拍). Together, sanyan and erpai are one of the greatest ancient Chinese vernacular literatures.

Versions
There are two surviving original versions of Jingshi Tongyan, one located in Japan, belonging to Waseda University, and one in Taiwan, located in the National Library in Taipei. Because this collection was banned by the Chinese government at some point, almost all of the original copies were burned. By the early 20th century, when the Republic of China emerged, this collection was already lost. It was not until a scholar from China visiting Japan in the 1930s discovered an original copy of the collection did Jingshi Tongyan becomes popular again. The scholar had taken pictures of each page of the book and brought back to China, where it was republished again.

List of Stories
Translated titles in this table mainly follow those by Shuhui Yang and Yunqin Yang in  Titles used by other translators are listed as bullet points.

Popularity
Jingshi Tongyan proved to be popular in China after its republication. Many of the stories from the collection were used as the basis of Chinese Opera in the 60s before the Chinese Cultural Revolution. Jingshi Tongyan also proved to be popular in Japan as well, where stories were taken and transformed into Japanese tales by changing the setting to Japan.

Notes

Chinese anthologies
1624 books
Short stories by Feng Menglong
Chinese short story collections